The Menshikov Palace is a Petrine Baroque edifice in Saint Petersburg, situated on Universitetskaya Embankment of the Bolshaya Neva on Vasilyevsky Island. It was the first stone building in the city. Since 1981, it has served as a public museum, a branch of the Hermitage Museum.

The palace was founded in 1710 as a residence of Saint Petersburg Governor General Alexander Menshikov and built by Italian architects Giovanni Maria Fontana, and, later, German architect Gottfried Johann Schädel. It was opened in 1711, but the construction continued until 1727 (assisted by Domenico Trezzini, Bartolomeo Rastrelli, Georg Johann Mattarnovy and Jean-Baptiste Le Blond), when Menshikov with his family was exiled to Siberia and his property was confiscated.

In 1731 the First Cadet Corps were established and occupied the palace and neighboring buildings. At the end of the 19th century the Menshikov Palace was restored and became the museum of the Corps. In 1924, its collections were moved to the Hermitage and other museums. From 1956 to 1981 the Menshikov Palace was restored again and finally opened to the public as a branch of the Hermitage Museum with a collection of Russian art of the late 17th-early 18th century.

See also 
 List of Baroque residences

References

Sources
 Калязина Н. В. Меншиковский дворец-музей. 2nd ed. Leningrad: Lenizdat, 1989. .

External links 
 Menshikov Palace (Saint Petersburg)

Palaces in Saint Petersburg
Hermitage Museum
Houses completed in 1727
Museums established in 1981
Art museums and galleries in Saint Petersburg
Historic house museums in Saint Petersburg
Universitetskaya Embankment
Baroque architecture in Saint Petersburg
Domenico Trezzini buildings and structures
1981 establishments in the Soviet Union
Cultural heritage monuments of federal significance in Saint Petersburg